Roger Francis Crispian Hollis (born 17 November 1936, in Bristol) is the Bishop Emeritus of Portsmouth for the Roman Catholic Church.

Early life
Crispian Hollis' parents were Christopher Hollis (1902–1977), the author and parliamentarian, and Madeleine Hollis (née King). Both his parents were received into the Roman Catholic Church. He is possibly unique among Catholic bishops in being the grandson of an Anglican bishop, the Right Revd George Arthur Hollis (1868–1944), vice-principal of Wells Theological College and later suffragan Bishop of Taunton, and the nephew of another, the Right Revd Arthur Michael Hollis, Bishop of Madras (1942-1954).

Hollis was educated at Stonyhurst College. He completed his national service as a 2nd Lt. with the Somerset Light Infantry which saw military action in Malaya. Upon his return from military service, Hollis earned an M.A. from Balliol College, Oxford. He then went to the Venerable English College in Rome, where he was ordained a priest for the Diocese of Clifton on 11 July 1965, and subsequently received a Licentiate of Sacred Theology (STL). For some time during the 1970s he was the chaplain at the Oxford University Catholic Chaplaincy.

Ministry
In 1981 he was appointed Administrator of Clifton Cathedral in Bristol and Vicar General of the Diocese of Clifton. While still in this post, he was appointed a member of the IBA's panel of religious advisers and in 1986 became a member of the Central Religious Advisory Committee (CRAC) for the BBC and the IBA.

Episcopal career

In February 1987, Hollis followed in the family footsteps when, like his grandfather and his uncle, he was appointed as auxiliary bishop (known as a "suffragan bishop" in the Church of England) to Archbishop Maurice Noël Léon Couve de Murville of the Archdiocese of Birmingham. Hollis was given special responsibility for the Oxfordshire area. This was not to last, for he was installed as Bishop of Portsmouth on 27 January 1989.

Hollis has been Chairman of the Catholic Media Trust and also Chairman of the Bishops' Committee for Europe. He served as a member of the Pontifical Council for Social Communications in the Vatican, as Chairman of the Bishops' Conference Department of Mission and Unity, Representative for the Bishops' Conference of the Churches Together in Britain and Ireland and a Member of IARCCUM (International Anglican Roman Catholic Committee for Unity and Mission). He is said to enjoy cricket and golf and, in the family tradition, to take a keen interest in current affairs.

Holy Trinity Monastery, East Hendred, a monastery of contemplative Benedictine nuns situated in the Vale of White Horse, Oxfordshire, and part of the Roman Catholic Diocese of Portsmouth was founded by Hollis in 2004.

In 2011, aged 75, Hollis announced that he would be retiring as soon as a replacement could be found. On Tuesday 11 July 2012, an official press release from the Vatican Information Service (VIS) of the Holy See Press Office stated that Pope Benedict XVI had named Philip Egan, Vicar General of the Roman Catholic Diocese of Shrewsbury, as Bishop-Elect of Portsmouth. Egan was consecrated as the Eighth Bishop of Portsmouth, with Bishop Hollis serving as Principal Consecrator, on 24 September 2012, the Feast of Our Lady of Walsingham. Bishop Hollis retired from his position as Apostolic Administrator for the Diocese of Portsmouth. He now lives in the small village of Mells, Somerset. The diocese issued a special commemorative edition of their newspaper to mark his retirement. In addition, the street which passes Portsmouth Roman Catholic Cathedral and the Bishop's house, previously part of Edinburgh Road, was renamed Bishop Crispian Way in his honour.

Lourdes
Hollis actively encourages people to travel to Lourdes, to which he has a great attachment, first going there in 1967 as a chaplain with the Oxford University Pilgrimage and then going annually with them until 1981. On returning to the Diocese of Clifton he travelled with the Clifton Pilgrimage each year up until 1986 and with the Portsmouth diocese since 1987.

The Portsmouth diocese, together with the Dioceses of Clifton, East Anglia, Northampton and Southwark, plus Stonyhurst College travel each year with the Catholic Association Pilgrimage to Lourdes. Hollis was the Patron of the Catholic Association Hospitalité until 2011.

References

External links

1936 births
Living people
Alumni of Balliol College, Oxford
People educated at Stonyhurst College
Clergy from Bristol
20th-century Roman Catholic bishops in England
Roman Catholic bishops of Portsmouth
21st-century Roman Catholic bishops in England